The 37th National Film Awards, presented by Ministry of Information, Bangladesh to felicitate the best of Bangladeshi Cinema released in 2012. Prime Minister gave Awards to the hand of award winner in the National Film Awards 2012 ceremony at afternoon on 10 May 2014 at Bangabandhu International Conference Center, Dhaka.

List of winners
National Film Awards of 24 categories were given in this ceremony that night.

Host and performance
Actors Ferdous Ahmed and Moushumi anchored the cultural programme after the award distribution ceremony. The history of Bangladeshi film was presented through performances of songs including "Karar Oi Loho Kopat," "Aynate Oi Mukh Dekhbe Jokhon," "Are O Praner Raja," "Bimurto Ei Ratri Amar," "Ki Jadu Korila," "Bender Meye Jostna," "Ekatturer Maa Jononi" .

Sabina Yasmin sang her song "Koto Sadhonay Emon Bhagyo Mele" and Subir Nandi sang  "Din Jay Kotha Thake."  S.I. Tutul, Dilshad Nahar Kona and Habib Wahid also performed at the event.

The final performance of the night was group dance recitation of Omar Sany, Zayed Khan, Nirob, Nipun Akter, Shimla, Amrita Khan.

See also
 Meril Prothom Alo Awards
 Ifad Film Club Award
 Babisas Award

References

External links

National Film Awards (Bangladesh) ceremonies
2012 film awards
2014 awards in Bangladesh
2014 in Dhaka
May 2014 events in Bangladesh